Thomas Rork Scott Ferguson (10 February 1884 – 4 March 1955) was a Liberal party member of the House of Commons of Canada. He was born in Peterborough County, Ontario and became a farmer.

Ferguson attended high school at Norwood. In 1934, Ferguson was a regional reeve of Dummer and Asphodel Townships. He also became a Peterborough County Warden in that year.

He was first elected to Parliament at the Hastings—Peterborough riding in the 1935 general election. After serving one term, the 18th Canadian Parliament, Ferguson was defeated by George Stanley White of the National Government party. In the 1945 election, Ferguson was unsuccessful in unseating White.

References

External links
 

1884 births
Canadian farmers
Liberal Party of Canada MPs
Members of the House of Commons of Canada from Ontario
Mayors of places in Ontario
1955 deaths